Martin Psenner (born 2 March 1976) is an Italian luger who has competed since 1994. A natural track luger, he won the bronze medal in the men's doubles event at the 1996 FIL World Luge Natural Track Championships in Oberperfuss, Austria.

Psenner also won two consecutive silver medals in the men's doubles event at the FIL European Luge Natural Track Championships (1995, 1997).

References
FIL-Luge profile
Natural track European Championships results 1970-2006.
Natural track World Championships results: 1979-2007

External links
 

1976 births
Living people
Italian lugers
Italian male lugers
People from Völs am Schlern
Sportspeople from Südtirol